Theresa Diederich (born November 5, 1992) is an American soccer player who plays as a midfielder.

External links 
 

1992 births
Living people
American women's soccer players
Women's association football midfielders
Alabama Crimson Tide women's soccer players
NJ/NY Gotham FC players
National Women's Soccer League players